Emily Dunn (née Kennard; formerly Tyndall) is an American actress and dancer from Salt Lake City, Utah, who made her acting debut in Napoleon Dynamite in 2004, under her maiden name Emily Kennard.

The youngest of six children, she began dancing at age three, drawing at age 4, singing and acting at age 8. When she was 15, she began competing International Standard and International Latin. At age 19, Emily earned a position on the Young Ambassadors, an international performing group for Brigham Young University (BYU). She traveled across the United States and also to Brazil and Argentina performing a show called Broadway Rhythm. She shot to fame on her feature film debuts as Amanda George in the 1999 romance hit Never Been Kissed and Trisha in Napoleon Dynamite. At BYU, she attended acting classes with future co-star Jon Heder.

Personal life
She graduated in April 2005 from Brigham Young University with a Bachelor of Fine Arts in illustration. She currently works for Disney as an Art Manager at a video game development studio. She was first married to Spencer Tyndall from 2004 to 2008; the couple divorced. She remarried on March 19, 2009, to Adam Dunn, with whom she has five children, twin daughters Emmylou and Dani, born in March 2011, sons Matthew Griffin, born in August 2013, and Kaden Alexander, born in June 2015.

Filmography
Never Been Kissed - Amanda George
Napoleon Dynamite – Trisha (as Emily Kennard)
White Noise (2005 film) - Julietta (as Emily Tyndall)
The Hills Have Eyes 2 - Andrea Rose (as Emily Tyndall)
By the Way (Theory of a Deadman song) (music video)- Girl (as Emily Tyndall)
My Girlfriend's Boyfriend – Jamie (as Emily Dunn)
Setup (2011 film) - Cassandra Long, Vincent's girlfriend-turned fiancee
Forever Strong – Jamie (as Emily Tyndall)
Pirates of the Great Salt Lake – Ruby (as Emily Tyndall)
Reflections in the Mud – Phonius Operator (as Emily Tyndall)
Crossroads – Kimberly (as Emily Tyndall)
The Black Phone - Georgia (as Emily Tyndall- Dunn)

Video games
Hannah Montana: Spotlight World Tour (2007) – game designer, artist, actress, dancer, choreographer
Meet the Robinsons (2007) – artist
Chicken Little: Ace in Action (2006) – artist
Chicken Little (2005) – artist
Tak: The Great Juju Challenge (2005) – artist
Tak 2: The Staff of Dreams (2004) – artist
Tak and the Power of Juju (2003) – artist
Rugrats: Royal Ransom (2002) – artist

Theater
Christmas Without Mr. C – Musical by Janeen Brady, Role: Maude (Head Elf)
Meet Me in St. Louis – Role: Rose

Discography
Journey
Lord is My Light – Young Ambassadors

External links

Living people
21st-century American actresses
American female dancers
Dancers from Utah
American film actresses
American Latter Day Saints
Brigham Young University alumni
Actresses from Salt Lake City
Year of birth missing (living people)